Wodzisław Śląski railway station is a railway station in Wodzisław Śląski, Poland.

The station opened in 1882. As of 2019, it is served by Koleje Śląskie, Przewozy Regionalne (local and regional services), Leo Express and PKP Intercity (international and intercity services). InterRegio and Koleje Śląskie services are on the line between Katowice and Bohumin also Kraków – Chałupki. PKP Intercity services are on the lines between Warsaw and Prague, Budapest, Graz, Gdynia, Przemyśl and Vienna. Leo Express services are on the line between Prague and Kraków.

Railway stations in Poland opened in 1882
Railway stations in Silesian Voivodeship
Railway stations served by Przewozy Regionalne InterRegio
Railway station
Railway stations served by Koleje Śląskie